Securian Financial Group, Inc. is a mutual holding company that provides a range of financial products and services. Founded in St. Paul, Minnesota by Russell Dorr on August 6, 1880, Securian Financial provides insurance, investment retirement products and Trust services to more than 19 million clients in the United States, Puerto Rico and Canada.

As of 2018, the company managed $78.6 billion in assets and had nearly $1.2 trillion in insurance in force.

Robert Senkler was the CEO from 1994 to 2014. Chris Hilger is the current chairman, president and CEO.

Corporate Organization
Minnesota Mutual Companies, Inc. is the parent holding company headquartered in St. Paul, MN with a mutual ownership model that operates under the name "Securian Financial". It is the parent of Securian Financial Group, Inc. (which is technically a stock subsidiary, but is not publicly owned or traded), as well as several other companies that provide a broad range of financial services, including:

 Minnesota Life Insurance Company
 Securian Life Insurance Company
 Securian Financial Services
 Securian Trust Company
 Allied Solutions
 Securian Asset Management
 Asset Allocation & Management Company (AAM)
 Securian Casualty Company
 American Modern Life Insurance Company
 Southern Pioneer Life Insurance Company

References

External links
 Securian Home Page

Financial services companies of the United States
Financial services companies established in 1880
1880 establishments in Minnesota
Companies based in Saint Paul, Minnesota
Mutual companies of the United States